Johanna Ismael Celis (born July 29, 1995), better known as Kiray Celis, is a Filipino actress, comedian, entrepreneur and vlogger.

Career

Acting
Celis was first discovered when she joined a contest called Muntíng Miss U of Magandang Tanghali Bayan at the age of 3. Soon after the contest, she joined the noontime show as the youngest cast member. Her first movie appearance was in the movie Pera o Bayong (not da TV) starring the entire MTB cast.

In 2005, Celis was chosen as one of the cast members in the children's gag show Goin' Bulilit that aired every Sunday. She was on the show until she graduated in 2009.

Celis starred as Desiree, one of Clara's friends in the TV series Mara Clara alongside Kathryn Bernardo and Julia Montes. She then again starred as Britney in the youth-oriented show Growing Up, again with Bernardo and Montes, being paired with Winston. Her most recent appearance was when she played the role of Whitney Munoz in the comedy youth-oriented show, the Sunday afternoon series Luv U.

After 19 years of staying ABS-CBN, Celis transferred to GMA Network as she signed a contract with GMA Artist Center (now Sparkle) on December 20, 2018. She joined the cast of Jennylyn Mercado and Gabby Concepcion-topbilled rom-com series Love You Two.

Business 
In 2018, Celis opened a restaurant called Chicks and Fins, where she served as the founder.

Filmography

Television

Film

Awards

References

External links

Sparkle GMA Artist Center profile

1995 births
Living people
Filipino child actresses
Filipino film actresses
Filipino television actresses
Filipino women comedians
ABS-CBN personalities
Star Magic
GMA Network personalities
20th-century Filipino actresses
21st-century Filipino actresses
21st-century Filipino businesspeople